The following lists events that happened during 1996 in Pakistan.

Incumbents

Federal government
President: Farooq Leghari 
Prime Minister: Benazir Bhutto (until 5 November), Malik Meraj Khalid (starting 5 November)
Chief Justice: Sajjad Ali Shah

Governors
Governor of Balochistan – Imran Ullah Khan 
Governor of Khyber Pakhtunkhwa – 
 until 5 November: Khurshid Ali Khan
 5 November-11 November: Said Ibne Ali
 starting 11 November: Arif Bangash
Governor of Punjab – 
 until 6 November: Raja Saroop Khan
 6 November-11 November: Khalilur Rehman
 starting 11 November: Khawaja Tariq Rahim 
Governor of Sindh – Kamaluddin Azfar

Events 
  Prime Minister Benazir Bhutto is dismissed for a second time on charges of corruption.

March 
 17 March – Sri Lanka defeat Australia in Lahore in the finals of the cricket world cup.

Births 

 Benazir Bhutto

Benazir Bhutto was born in June 21, 1953, in Karachi the biggest city of Pakistan. Bhutto was born at Pinto's Nursing Home in Karachi, Sindh, Pakistan. Her father name is Zulfikar Ali Bhutto and He was the politician and her mother was Begum Nusrat Ispahani.

 Syed Ali Mujtaba Shah Bokhari

Syed Ali Mujtaba Shah Bokhari was born in April 5, 1996 in Lahore and is a professional squash player who represented Pakistan. He reached a career-high world ranking of World No. 133 in April 2013.
 Ahmed Siddiqui 
Ahmed Siddiqui  was born in 1996 and He is an American of Pakistani descent who described being kidnapped with his mother and two younger siblings in March 2003.

The repeated bomb blasts in major cities of Punjab during 1995-1996 terrorized people. During the year 1995–96, this state was in great curse and the government was in several dilemmas. The opposition party of Mian Muhammad Nawaz Sharif made the situation of law and order. This resulted in dissolution of the assemblies...

Deaths
In 1996 two-thousands people were killed in Karachi. The PPP, with its own government in Sindh, had the unique opportunity to heal the wounds of ethnic violence in Karachi.

 September 20; Murtaza Bhutto, (born 1954), leader of the opposition party Pakistan Peoples Party (Shaheed Bhutto) killed during a gunfight with police.
 November 21; Abdus Salam, (born 1926), Pakistani Nobel physicist dies in Oxford.

See also
1995 in Pakistan
Other events of 1996
1997 in Pakistan
Timeline of Pakistani history

References

 
Pakistan

